Audrey Hancock (28 February 1919 – 21 October 2017) was a British swimmer. She competed in women's 100 metre backstroke at the 1936 Summer Olympics. She also competed at the 1934 British Empire Games and was the amateur backstroke lady champion of the Midlands.

References

1919 births
2017 deaths
British female swimmers
Olympic swimmers of Great Britain
Swimmers at the 1936 Summer Olympics
Sportspeople from Dudley
Female backstroke swimmers
Swimmers at the 1934 British Empire Games
Commonwealth Games competitors for England